The Kuwait Democratic Forum (KDF) is a centre-left political group founded in 1991. Members of the KDF include Ahmad Al-Khatib, Abdullah Al-Naibari, Saleh Al-Mulla, the late Ahmad Al-Rub'i.

Ideology 

The Kuwait Democratic Forum is an Arab nationalist and Pan-Arabist organisation, which pursues a secular government inspired by tenets of Islam. and claims to be working towards achieving full democracy and instilling respect of human rights and freedoms. It is an opposition group which advocated women's political rights, electoral districting reform, and the separation of the positions of Crown Prince and Prime Minister. KDF is currently advocating: 
 the reform of the electoral districting statute; 
 the repeal of all freedom-constricting laws;
 the enactment of a pardoning bill for all political detainees in Kuwait;
 the amendment of the citizenship statute to enable judicial review over executive citizenship stripping decisions;
 the call for a national convention addressing pertinent issues in Kuwait including economic, societal and political issues; and 
 an elected government.

Structure and composition 

The KDF is directed by a bi-annually elected General Secretariat currently headed by Bandar Al-Khairan.

References

External links
Official website

1992 establishments in Kuwait
Arab nationalist political parties
Arab socialist political parties
Political parties established in 1992
Political parties in Kuwait